Divya Deshmukh (born 9 December 2005) is an Indian chess Woman Grandmaster (WGM) from Maharashtra. She is the National Woman Chess Champion 2022. She is also an individual bronze medal winner at FIDE Olympiad 2022. She was also part of the gold medal-winning FIDE Online Chess Olympiad 2020 team. As of August 2022, she is the 12th ranked woman chess player in India, and is the reigning national women's champion.

References 

2005 births
Living people
Chess woman grandmasters
Indian female chess players